The Air Taxi Association (ATXA) was founded in June 2007 with the goal of encouraging the adoption of the next-generation air taxi model, commonly referred to as very light jet.

American founding members

BusinessJetSeats
Earthjet
ImagineAir
Jumpjet
Linear Air
POGO Jets Inc.
SATSair
Virgin Charter

European founding members
AccelJet
Air-Cannes
AirCab
Blink
byJets
ETIRC
GlobeAir
Jet Ready
JetBird
London Executive Aviation
NexusJets
Taxijet
Wondair

See also 
 Air taxi

External links 
Air Taxi Association (ATXA)

Airline trade associations
Aviation organizations based in the United States